New Coalinga Municipal Airport  is three miles east of Coalinga, in Fresno County, California, United States. It is owned by the city of Coalinga.

The original Coalinga Municipal Airport was about 0.5 mile (1 km) north of the town center, just north of Cambridge Avenue and west of East Elm Avenue. It opened sometime in the 1920s.  traces of it could still be seen on aerial photographs and satellite images. The New Coalinga Municipal Airport was built in the late 1990s east of the town center, with an entrance road from West Phelps Avenue.

Facilities

In the year ending May 9, 2003 the airport had 2,400 aircraft operations, all general aviation.

References

External links

Airports in Fresno County, California